Irene Ware (born Irene Catherine Ahlberg; November 6, 1910 – March 11, 1993) was an American actress. She was a beauty queen and showgirl before appearing in 29 films between 1932 and 1940, and is mostly remembered for her roles as Princess Nadji in Chandu the Magician (1932) with Edmund Lowe and Bela Lugosi, and as Boris Karloff's and Lugosi's leading lady in 1935's The Raven.

Early years

Irene Catherine Ahlberg was born November 6, 1910, in Albany, New York. Her father, Ernest Ahlberg, born in Sweden, managed a saloon. Her mother, Anna Freya, born in New York of Austrian parents, was a real estate agent. She lived in New York and Los Angeles. Her sister, Anita, was an artist.

Beauty queen
As an 18-year-old stenographer, (5`6"/1.68 cm tall), Ware was crowned Miss Greater New York, then Miss United States in 1929, and the same year was first runner-up for the title of Miss Universe at a pageant held in Galveston, Texas. She also won $1,000. ("Miss United States" was an unofficial alternative to the Miss America Pageant, which was not held in 1929. The Miss Universe contest of the 1920s was not connected to the current Miss Universe system, which was launched in 1952.)

Acting
Ware debuted on stage in a revue at the Metropolitan Theatre Boston in July 1929, She performed in Early Carroll's Sketch Book (1929) and in the 1930 and 1931 versions of Earl Carroll's Vanities on Broadway. She was then contracted to Fox Studios and moved to Hollywood, changing her name to Irene Ware. Her first movie was Society Girl, in 1932 at Fox Film Corporation as uncredited together with names like James Dunn, Peggy Shannon and Spencer Tracy. The second film, which quickly made her a star, was Chandu the Magician, also released in 1932 and directed by Marcel Varnel.

Personal life 
Ware's first marriage was to American screenwriter John Meehan, Jr., who won three Oscars for his work. Her second marriage was to federal Judge Fred Campbell. She left the industry to become a mother to their two children, John and Deirdre Meehan.

Author Gregory William Mank wrote in 'Bela Lugosi and Boris Karloff the Expanded Story of a Haunting Collaboration', (McFarland & Company), (2010), that Ware lived in Encinitas; had "Severe dementia"; and that she died in the evening, of "Pneumonia", in the Western Medical Centre, Santa Ana.

Filmography

1932: Society Girl - (uncredited)
1932: Chandu the Magician - Princess Nadji
1932: Six Hours to Live - The Prostitute
1933: Humanity - Olive Pelton
1933: Brief Moment - Joan
1933: My Weakness - Eve Millstead
1934: Moulin Rouge - show girl (uncredited)
1934: Orient Express - Janet Pardoe
1934: Let's Talk It Over - Sandra
1934: The Affairs of Cellini - Daughter Of The House Of Bocci
1934: You Belong To Me - Lila Lacey
1934: King Kelly of the U.S.A. - Princess Tania aka Catherine Bell
1935: Rendezvous at Midnight - Myra
1935: Night Life of the Gods - Diana
1935: Whispering Smith Speaks - Nan Roberts
1935: The Raven - Jean Thatcher
1935: Cheers of the Crowd - Mary Larkin
1935: Happiness C.O.D. - Carroll Sherridan
1935: False Pretenses - Mary Beekman
1936: The Dark Hour - Elsa Carson
1936: Murder at Glen Athol - Jane Maxwell
1936: O'Malley of the Mounted - Edith "Edie" Hyland
1936: In Paris, A.W.O.L. - Constance
1936: Federal Agent - Helen Lynch / Helen Gray
1936: Gold Diggers of 1937 - Irene (Sally´s pal)
1937: The Live Wire - Jane
1938: No Parking - Olga
1938: Around The Town - Norma Wyngold
1940: Outside the Three-Mile Limit - Dorothy Kenney (final film role)

References

External links

 
 

1910 births
1993 deaths
20th-century American actresses
Actresses from New York City
American beauty pageant winners
American film actresses
American people of Austrian descent
American people of Swedish descent
American stage actresses